The Joseph Campbell Foundation is a US not-for-profit organization dedicated to preserve, protect and perpetuate the work of influential American mythologist Joseph Campbell (1904–1987). It fosters academic and popular discussion in the fields of comparative mythology and religion, psychology and culture through its publishing program, events, local groups (Mythological RoundTable groups) and its website.

The foundation was created in 1990 by Campbell's widow, choreographer Jean Erdman, and by his longtime editor Robert Walter, who is the foundation's president.

Among the initiatives undertaken by the JCF are: 
The Collected Works of Joseph Campbell, a series of books and recordings (both previously released and posthumous) that pulls together Campbell's myriad-minded work
the Erdman Campbell Award
the Mythological RoundTable groups, a global network of local groups that explore the subjects of comparative mythology, psychology, religion and culture 
the collection of Campbell's personal library and papers housed at the OPUS Archives and Research Center (see below) and the New York Public Library (see below)

References

External links
Joseph Campbell Foundation
 The Joseph Campbell/Marija Gimbutas Library at Pacifica Graduate Institute
The New York Public Library's collection of Joseph Campbell's papers

Charities based in California
Comparative mythology
Joseph Campbell